Oliver Hill is a hill,  high, in the Peak District in the county of Staffordshire in England. The summit has a tiny cairn near some aerials.

References 

Mountains and hills of the Peak District
Mountains and hills of Derbyshire